is Zard's 25th single released on September 17, 1998, under B-Gram Records label. The single reached #1 rank during the first week after being released. It charted for 9 weeks and sold 247,000 copies. When Izumi Sakai died, it was elected as her fourth best song on the Oricon polls.

Track list
All songs are written by Izumi Sakai and arranged by Daisuke Ikeda

composer: Seiichiro Kuribayashi
OA(on air), single and album version have different arrangements
the song was used as 4th opening theme for anime Detective Conan
OA version of this song was fixed weekly during airings many times before its official release of single
OA ver. wasn't released until 2012 in Zard Album Collection in Premium Disc
In 2016, the pop girl group La PomPon covered this song to celebrate Zard's 25th anniversary of debut and it became the 50th ending theme for anime Detective Conan

composer: Aika Ohno
for first time Aika Ohno composed song for Zard
the song was used for Detective Conan Movie The Fourteenth Target as theme song
 (Original karaoke)

References

1998 singles
Zard songs
Case Closed songs
Japanese film songs
Songs written for animated films
Oricon Weekly number-one singles
Songs written by Izumi Sakai
Songs written by Seiichiro Kuribayashi